Johnny Ned Adams (born in 1960) is a pilot, a businessman and a former mayor of the village of Kuujjuaq in Quebec, Canada. His leadership helped the development of his community and has been recognized by the Quebec government by naming him Knight of the National Order of Quebec in 2006.

References 

1960 births
Inuit from Quebec
Inuit politicians
Living people
Mayors of places in Quebec
Knights of the National Order of Quebec